Vanacampus poecilolaemus, also known as the Australian long-nosed pipefish is a species of marine fish belonging to the family Syngnathidae. They can be found inhabiting seaweed and seagrass beds of estuaries along the southern coast of Australia including the northern coast of Tasmania. Their diet likely consists of small crustaceans such as mysid shrimps. Adults of this species can reach up to 30 cm in length. Reproduction occurs through ovoviviparity in which the males brood eggs before giving live birth to roughly 40-50 offspring.

References

External links 

 Vanacampus poecilolaemus at FishBase
 Vanacampus poecilolaemus at Fishes of Australia

Syngnathidae
Fish described in 1868
Taxa named by Wilhelm Peters